Adventfjorden (Advent Bay) is a 7 km long and 4 km wide bay running south-eastwards from the southern side of Isfjorden, on the west coast of Spitsbergen in Svalbard. The name represents a corruption of Adventure Bay - probably named after the Hull-built whaleship Adventure, which operated in Isfjorden in 1656. The fjord was originally known as Klass Billen Bay. At the head of Adventfjorden is Adventdalen (Advent Valley).

The former mining-camp of Longyearbyen (now Svalbard's main town) lies on the fjord's southwestern shore, while another former mining-camp, Hiorthhamn, is located on its northeastern shore.

References

Conway, W. M. 1906. No Man's Land: A History of Spitsbergen from Its Discovery in 1596 to the Beginning of the Scientific Exploration of the Country. Cambridge: At the University Press.
 Norwegian Polar Institute: Place names in Norwegian polar areas 

Bays of Spitsbergen
Longyearbyen